Kāvya (Devanagari: काव्य, IAST: kāvyá) refers to the Sanskrit literary style used by Indian court poets flourishing between c.200 BCE and 1200 CE. 

This literary style, which includes both poetry and prose, is characterised by abundant usage of figures of speech such as metaphors, similes, and hyperbole to create its characteristic emotional effects. The result is a short lyrical work, court epic, narrative or dramatic work. Kāvya can refer to the style or the completed body of literature. Aśvaghoṣa (c. 80–150 AD), a philosopher and poet considered the father of Sanskrit drama, is attributed with first using the term.

Early kāvya
Although very little literature in the kāvya style written before the time of Kālidāsa (5th century CE) survives, it can be assumed from quotations in Patañjali's grammatical treatise the Mahābhāṣya (2nd century BCE), as well as from poems written on various inscriptions of the 4th to 6th centuries CE, that it dates back to an early time. 

One early epic work in this style is the Buddhacarita by Aśvaghoṣa (2nd century CE). Only the first half of this survives in Sanskrit, and the rest in a Chinese translation made c. 420 CE.

Mahākāvya
Kālidāsa is believed to have lived in the early 5th century CE. He is the author of two epics, the Raghuvaṃśa and Kumārasambhava. These two epics are traditionally known as mahākāvya "great epics".

Other writers of great epics were Bhāravi (6th century CE), author of Kirātārjunīya; Māgha (c. 7th Century CE), author of Śiśupāla·vadha, an epic famous for its linguistic ingenuity, and Śrīharṣa (12th century CE), author of Naiṣadhīya·carita. Another epic often called a mahākāvya, is Bhaṭṭikāvya, which is simultaneously a narrative and a manual of grammatical instruction. It is believed by some to have been written by the 7th-century poet and grammarian Bhartṛihari.

Prose writers
Those who wrote in prose included Subandhu (5th or 7th century CE?), author of Vasavadatta, a romantic tale, and Bāṇabhaṭṭa (also called Bāṇa) (7th century CE), author of Kadambari, a romantic novel, and of Harṣacarita, a biography written in poetic prose.

Another well-known writer of the period was Daṇḍin (7th–8th century CE), who as well as poetry, wrote the Kāvyādarśa, a discussion of poetics, and the Daśa·kumāra·carita.

Some examples of kāvya

Epics
Rāmāyaṇa – Vālmīki
Mahābhārata – Vyāsa
Kumāra-sambhava – Kālidāsa
Buddha-carita – Aśva-ghoṣa
Raghu-vaṃśa – Kālidāsa
Madhurā-vijaya – Gaṅgā-devī
Kṛṣṇa-vilāsa – Sukumāra
Vikramāṅka-deva-carita – Bilhaṇa
Śiva-līlārṇava – Nīlakaṇṭha-dīkṣita
Kirātārjunīya – Bhāravi
Śiśupāla-vadha – Māgha
Naiṣadhīya-carita – Śrī-harṣa
Jānakī-pariṇaya – Cakra-kavi
Raghunāthābhyudaya – Rāma-bhadrāmbā
Gāṅgāvataraṇa – Nīlakaṇṭha-dīkṣita
Daśāvatāra-carita – Kṣemendra
Pūrva-purāṇa – Jina-sena
Rugmiṇīśa-vijaya – Vādi-rāja
Dharma-śarmābhyudaya – Hari-candra
Bāla-bhārata – Amara-candra
Śrīkaṇṭha-carita – Maṅkha
Rāma-carita – Abhinanda
Jānakī-haraṇa – Kumāra-dāsa
Yādavābhyudaya – Vedānta-deśika
Yudhiṣṭhira-vijaya – Vāsudeva
Rāvaṇa-vadha – Bhaṭṭi
Kapphiṇābhyudaya – Śiva-svāmī
Hara-vijaya – Ratnākara
Rāghava-pāṇḍavīya – Kavi-rāja

Plays
Ūru-bhaṅga – Bhāsa
Svapna-vāsavadatta – Bhāsa
Matta-vilāsa-prahasana – Mahendra-varmā
Bhagavadajjukīya – Mahendra-varmā
Mṛcchakaṭika – Śūdraka
Kunda-mālā – Diṅnāga
Mālavikāgnimitra – Kālidāsa
Ratnāvalī – Harṣa-vardhana
Vikramorvaśīya – Kālidāsa
Abhijñāna-śākuntala – Kālidāsa
Nāgānanda – Harṣa-vardhana
Prabodha-candrodaya – Kṛṣṇa-miśra
Uttara-rāma-carita – Bhava-bhūti
Veṇī-saṃhāra – Bhaṭṭa-nārāyaṇa
Mudrā-rākṣasa – Viśākha-datta
Padma-prābhṛtaka – Śūdraka
Pāda-tāḍitaka – Śyāmilaka
Pratijñā-yaugandharāyaṇa – Bhāsa
Hāsya-cūḍāmaṇi – Vatsa-rāja
Karpūra-carita-bhāṇa – Vatsa-rāja
Bāla-carita – Bhāsa
Avimāraka – Bhāsa
Āścarya-cūḍāmaṇi – Śakti-bhadra
Priya-darśikā – Harṣa-vardhana
Karṇa-sundarī – Bilhaṇa
Tāpasa-vatsa-rāja – Māyu-rāja
Naiṣadhānanda – Kṣemīśvara
Viddha-śālabhañjikā – Rāja-śekhara
Laṭaka-melaka – Śaṅkha-dhara
Hāsyārṇava – Jagadīśa
Prasanna-rāghava – Jaya-deva
Mahāvīra-carita – Bhava-bhūti
Mālatī-mādhava – Bhava-bhūti
Hanumannāṭaka
Ubhayābhisārikā – Vara-ruci
Dhūrta-viṭa-saṃvāda – Īśvara-datta
Anargha-rāghava – Murāri
Bāla-rāmāyaṇa – Rāja-śekhara
Saṅkalpa-sūryodaya – Vedānta-deśika

Stories and Fables
Pañca-tantra – Viṣṇu-śarmā
Hitopadeśa – Nārāyaṇa-paṇḍita
Siṃhāsana-dvātriṃśikā
Vetāla-pañcaviṃśati – Jambhala-datta
Jātaka-mālā – Ārya-śūra
Bhoja-prabandha – Ballāḻa
Śuka-saptati – Cintā-maṇi
Puruṣa-parīkṣā – Vidyā-pati
Prabandha-koṣa – Rāja-śekhara
Prabandha-cintāmaṇi – Meru-tuṅga

Prose Works
Daśa-kumāra-carita – Daṇḍī
Kādambarī – Bāṇa-bhaṭṭa
Harṣa-carita – Bāṇa-bhaṭṭa
Tilaka-mañjarī – Dhana-pāla
Vāsava-dattā – Subandhu

Campū
Rāmāyaṇa-campū – Bhoja
Nīlakaṇṭha-vijaya-campū – Nīlakaṇṭha-dīkṣita
Viśva-guṇādarśa-campū – Veṅkaṭādhvarī
Bhārata-campū – Ananta-bhaṭṭa
Varadāmbikā-pariṇaya-campū – Tirumalāmbā
Yātrā-prabandha – Samara-puṅgava-dīkṣita
Nṛsiṃha-campū – Daivajña-sūrya
Pārijātāpaharaṇa-campū – Śeṣa-śrī-kṛṣṇa
Udaya-sundarī-kathā – Soḍḍhala
Yaśastilaka-campū – Soma-deva-sūri
Nala-campū – Trivikrama-bhaṭṭa

Short Poems
Ṛtu-saṃhāra – Kālidāsa
Nīti-dviṣaṣṭikā – Sundara-pāṇḍya
Nīti-śataka – Bhartṛhari
Vairāgya-śataka – Bhartṛhari
Amaru-śataka – Amaruka
Sabhā-rañjana – Nīlakaṇṭha-dīkṣita
Kali-viḍambana – Nīlakaṇṭha-dīkṣita
Vairāgya-śataka – Nīlakaṇṭha-dīkṣita
Śānti-vilāsa – Nīlakaṇṭha-dīkṣita
Megha-dūta – Kālidāsa
Bhāminī-vilāsa – Jagannātha
Gīta-govinda – Jaya-deva
Bhallaṭa-śataka – Bhallaṭa
Anyāpadeśa-śataka – Nīlakaṇṭha-dīkṣita
Mahiṣa-śataka – Vāñcheśvara
Dṛṣṭānta-kalikā-śataka – Kusuma-deva
Cāṇakya-nīti – Cāṇakya
Gumānī-śataka – Gumānī-kavi
Śānti-śataka – Śilhaṇa
Haṃsa-sandeśa – Vedānta-deśika
Kokila-sandeśa – Uddaṇḍa
Āryā-sapta-śatī – Govardhana
Tīrtha-prabandha – Vādi-rāja
Pārśvābhyudaya – Jina-sena
Sahṛdayānanda – Śrī-kṛṣṇānanda
Subhāṣita-kaustubha – Veṅkaṭādhvarī
Subhāṣita-nīvī – Vedānta-deśika

Devotional Hymns
Śivānanda-laharī – Śaṅkarācārya
Śrī-kṛṣṇa-karṇāmṛta – Līlā-śuka
Gaṅgā-laharī – Jagannātha
Śivotkarṣa-mañjarī – Nīlakaṇṭha-dīkṣita
Saundarya-laharī – Śaṅkarācārya
Sudhā-laharī – Jagannātha
Varada-rāja-stava – Appayya-dīkṣita
Ānanda-sāgara-stava – Nīlakaṇṭha-dīkṣita
Mūka-pañcaśatī – Mūka-kavi
Pādukā-sahasra – Vedānta-deśika
Lakṣmī-nṛsiṃha-karāvalambana-stotra – Śaṅkarācārya
Devyaparādha-kṣamāpaṇa-stotra – Śaṅkarācārya
Śiva-mahimnaḥ stotra – Puṣpa-danta
Śyāmalā-daṇḍaka
Śiva-pādādi-keśānta-stotra – Śaṅkarācārya
Viṣṇu-pādādi-keśānta-stotra – Śaṅkarācārya
Gopāla-viṃśati – Vedānta-deśika
Karuṇā-laharī – Jagannātha
Lakṣmī-laharī – Jagannātha
Rāma-karṇāmṛta – Rāmabhadra-dīkṣita
Rāmāṣṭa-prāsa – Rāmabhadra-dīkṣita
Raṅgarāja-stava – Parāśara-bhaṭṭa
Garuḍa-pañcāśat – Vedānta-deśika
Stuti-kusumāñjali – Jagaddhara
Caṇḍī-śataka – Bāṇa-bhaṭṭa
Sūrya-śataka – Mayūra
Nārāyaṇīya – Nārāyaṇa-bhaṭṭatiri
Devī-śataka – Ānanda-vardhana
Īśvara-śataka – Īśvara-kavi
Lakṣmī-sahasra – Veṅkaṭādhvarī

Satires and Verse Narratives
Darpa-dalana – Kṣemendra
Kuṭṭinī-mata – Dāmodara
Deśopadeśa – Kṣemendra
Kalā-vilāsa – Kṣemendra
Narma-mālā – Kṣemendra
Rāmāyaṇa-mañjarī – Kṣemendra
Bhārata-mañjarī – Kṣemendra
Kathā-sarit-sāgara – Soma-deva
Rāja-taraṅgiṇī – Kalhaṇa
Sevya-sevakopadeśa – Kṣemendra
Cāru-caryā – Kṣemendra
Bṛhatkathā-mañjarī – Kṣemendra
Caturvarga-saṅgraha – Kṣemendra
Deśopadeśa – Kṣemendra
Samaya-mātṛkā – Kṣemendra
Bhikṣāṭana-kāvya – Utprekṣā-vallabha

Anthologies
Samayocita-padya-mālikā
Subhāṣitāvalī – Vallabha-deva
Subhāṣita-ratna-koṣa – Vidyākara
Subhāṣita-ratna-bhāṇḍāgāra
Subhāṣita-sudhā-nidhi – Sāyaṇācārya
Padyāvalī – Rūpa-gosvāmī
Śārṅgadhara-paddhati – Śārṅgadhara
Sūkti-muktāvalī – Jalhaṇa
Sadukti-karṇāmṛta – Śrīdhara-dāsa

Modern Works
Vātsalya-rasāyana (short poem) – Sridhar Bhaskar Warnekar
Kāma-śuddhi (short play) – V Raghavan
Kālidāsa-rahasya (short poem) – Sridhar Bhaskar Warnekar
Nāṭya-pañcagavya (collection of short plays) – Abhiraj Rajendra Mishra
Pañca-kulyā (collection of short poems) – Abhiraj Rajendra Mishra
Prekṣaṇaka-trayī (collection of short plays) – V Raghavan
Candra-sena (play) – S D Joshi and Vighna Hari Deo
Laharī-daśaka (collection of short poems) – Radhavallabh Tripathi
Śiva-rājyodaya (epic) – Sridhar Bhaskar Warnekar
Anārkalī (play) – V Raghavan
Megha-prati-sandeśa (short poem) – Mandikal Rama Shastri
Kaṇṭakāñjali (satire) – K S Arjunwadkar
Vicchitti-vātāyanī (collection of verses) – Jagannath Pathak
Kāpiśāyinī (collection of short poems) – Jagannath Pathak
Parīvāha (collection of short poems) – Balram Shukla
Nipuṇa-prāghuṇaka (play) – Shankar Rajaraman
Bhārāvatāra-stava (devotional hymn) – Shankar Rajaraman
Mṛtkūṭa (short poem) – Bhaskaracharya Tripathi
Pratijñā-kauṭilya (play) – Jaggu Vakulabhushana
Citra-naiṣadha (short poem)– Shankar Rajaraman
Sītā-rāvaṇa-saṃvāda-jharī (short poem) – C Rama Shastri and Sitarama Shastri
Lokālaṅkāra-paṅkīya (satire) – S Jagannatha
Asta-vyasta (play) – S Jagannatha
Kāvya-kalāpa (collection of short poems) – Jaggu Shingararya
Abhirāja-saptaśatī (collection of short poems) – Abhiraj Rajendra Mishra
Abhirāja-sāhasrī (collection of short poems) – Abhiraj Rajendra Mishra
Nāṭya-nava-ratna (collection of short plays) – Abhiraj Rajendra Mishra
Rūpa-rudrīya (collection of short plays) – Abhiraj Rajendra Mishra
Akiñcana-kāñcana (play) – Abhiraj Rajendra Mishra
Mīrā-laharī (short poem) – Kshama Rao
Mṛgāṅka-dūta (short poem) – Abhiraj Rajendra Mishra
Kavitā-putrikā-jāti (collection of short poems) – Balram Shukla
Pratijñā-śāntanava (short play) – Jaggu Vakulabhushana
Maṇi-haraṇa (short play) – Jaggu Vakulabhushana
Apratima-pratima (short play) – Jaggu Vakulabhushana
Prasanna-kāśyapa (short play) – Jaggu Vakulabhushana
Vivekānanda-vijaya (play) – Sridhar Bhaskar Warnekar
Śatālaṅkāra-kṛṣṇa-śataka (short poem) – H V Nagaraja Rao
Vyājokti-muktāvalī (short poem) – Mahalinga Shastri
Bhramara-dūta (short poem) – Mahalinga Shastri
Adbhutāṃśuka (play) – Jaggu Vakulabhushana
Madhurāñjali (collection of poems) – Galagali Ramacharya
Adbhuta-dūta (epic) – Jaggu Vakulabhushana
Laghu-raghu (short poem) – Bhaskaracharya Tripathi
Devī-dānavīya (short poem) – Shankar Rajaraman

See also
 Sanskrit literature
 Mahākāvya

Notes

Glossary

References

Bibliography
 Keith, Arthur Berriedale,(1928). A History of Sanskrit Literature. (Oxford University Press).
 
 Warder, A.K., (1989). Indian Kavya Literature, South Asia Books.
 Kavya. (2007). Encyclopædia Britannica Online.
 Winternitz, M. A History of Indian Literature. Oriental books, New Delhi, 1972
 Gonda, Jan A History of Indian Literature, Otto Harrasowitz, Wiesbaden.
 

Poetry movements
Indian literary movements
Sanskrit literature
Ancient poets
Medieval poetry
Ancient literature

hi:काव्य